2018 Americas Challenge may refer to:

2018 Americas Challenge (January)
2018 Americas Challenge (November)